The 1928 Northwestern Wildcats team represented Northwestern University during the 1928 college football season. In their second year under head coach Dick Hanley, the Wildcats compiled a 5–3 record (2–3 against Big Ten Conference opponents) and finished in a tie for seventh place in the Big Ten Conference.

Schedule

References

Northwestern
Northwestern Wildcats football seasons
Northwestern Wildcats football